

Overview 

The Institute of Health and Social Care Management (IHSCM) is a professional organisation within the United Kingdom, for managers in the health and social care sectors. Its membership covers the National Health Service, independent health and social care providers, health care consultants, and the armed forces. Its Patron is the Duke of Edinburgh and current President is Lord Philip Hunt of Kings Heath.

Its historical development dates from the formation of the Hospital Officers Association (HOA) in 1885, the purpose of which was to provide facilities for hospital officers in London. In 1942 the HOA merged with the Association of Clerks and Stewards of Mental Hospitals, forming the Institute of Hospital Administrators (IHA).

The name of the organisation changed to the Institute of Health Service Administrators (IHSA) in 1970, to the Institute of Health Services Management (IHSM) in 1984, to the Institute of Healthcare Management (IHM) in 1999, and finally to the Institute of Health and Social Care Management (IHSCM) in 2021.

In October 2012, IHM became a part of the Royal Society for Public Health to promote healthcare management.

The IHSCM Team

References

Website 
 

Health in the City of Westminster
Organisations based in the City of Westminster
Healthcare Management
Medical and health organisations based in the United Kingdom
Social care in the United Kingdom
Healthcare in the United Kingdom